Aminopropane may refer to:

 Propylamine (1-aminopropane)
 Isopropylamine (2-aminopropane)